There are twelve provinces of the Netherlands, representing the administrative layer between the national government and the local municipalities, with responsibility for matters of subnational or regional importance.

With 383,488 inhabitants, Zeeland has the smallest population. In total about 10,000 people were employed by the provincial administrations in 2018.

The provinces of the Netherlands are joined in the Association of Provinces of the Netherlands (IPO). This organisation promotes the common interests of the provinces in the national government of the Netherlands in The Hague.

Politics and governance

The government of each province consists of three major parts:  
The States-Provincial is the provincial parliament elected every four years. The number of members varies between 39 and 55 (since 2015), depending on the number of inhabitants of the province. Being a member is a part-time job. The main task of the States-Provincial is to scrutinise the work of the provincial government.
The Provincial-Executive is a collegial body supported by a majority in the States-Provincial charged with most executive tasks. Each province has between three and seven deputies, each having their own portfolio. The task of the Provincial Executive is the overall management of the province.
The King's Commissioner is a single person appointed by the Crown who presides over the States-Provincial as well as over the Provincial Executive. The Commissioner is appointed for a term of six years, after which reappointment for another term is possible.

Elections

The members of the States-Provincial are elected every four years in direct elections. To a large extent, the same political parties are enlisted in these elections in the national elections. The chosen provincial legislators elect the members of the national Senate within three months after the provincial elections. The elections for the water boards take place on the same date as the provincial elections.

The last provincial elections were held in 2007, 2011, 2015 and in 2019. The next provincial elections are scheduled for 2023.

Competencies 
The provinces of the Netherlands have seven core tasks:
 Sustainable spatial development, including water management
 Environment, energy and climate
 Vital countryside
 Regional accessibility and regional public transport
 Regional economy
 Cultural infrastructure and preservation
 Quality of public administration

Financing
To a large extent, the provinces of the Netherlands are financed by the national government. Also, provinces have income from a part of the Vehicle Excise Duty. Several provinces have made a large profit in the past from privatising utility companies originally owned or partly owned by the provinces. Essent, which was originally owned by six provinces and more than a hundred municipalities, was sold for around 9.3 billion euros.

Geography
The country of the Netherlands, being the largest part of the Kingdom of the Netherlands, is divided into twelve provinces (provincies in Dutch) and three overseas special municipalities; Bonaire, Saba and Sint Eustatius in the Caribbean Netherlands that are not part of any province. Previously these were part of public bodies (openbare lichamen).

European Netherlands

Caribbean Netherlands

Notes

History

Nearly all Dutch provinces can trace their origin to a medieval county or duchy, as can the provinces of regions in Belgium. Their status changed when they came under a single ruler who centralised their administration, reducing their powers. There were 17 in total: from these unified Netherlands, seven northern provinces from 1588 formed the Republic of the Seven United Provinces, namely Holland, Zeeland, Gelderland, Utrecht, Friesland, Overijssel and Groningen.

The Republic's lands also included Drenthe (one of the 17, but without the autonomous status of the others), and parts of the Duchy of Brabant, Duchy of Limburg and County of Flanders, which were considered to be "conquered lands" and were governed directly by the States General, hence their name Generality Lands. They were called Staats-Brabant, Staats-Limburg and Staats-Vlaanderen, meaning "governed by the States General". Each of these "Netherlands" had a high degree of autonomy, cooperating with each other mainly on defense and foreign relations, but otherwise keeping to their own affairs.

On 1 January 1796, under the Batavian Republic, Drenthe and Staats-Brabant became the eighth and ninth provinces of the Netherlands. The latter, which had been known as Bataafs Brabant (English: Batavian Brabant), changed its name to Noord-Brabant, North Brabant, in 1815 when it became part of the United Kingdom of the Netherlands, which also contained (then) South Brabant, a province now in Belgium. This new unified state featured the provinces in their modern form, as non-autonomous subdivisions of the national state, and again numbering 17, though they were not all the same as the 16th century ones. In 1839, following the separation of Belgium, the province of Limburg was divided between the two countries, each now having a province called Limburg. A year later, Holland, the largest and most populous of the Dutch provinces, was also split into two provinces, for a total of 11. The 12th province to be created was Flevoland, consisting almost entirely of reclaimed land, established on 1 January 1986.

French period
During the Batavian Republic, the Netherlands was from 1798 to 1801 completely reorganised into eight new departments, most named after rivers, inspired by the French revolutionary example, in an attempt to do away with the old semi-autonomous status of the provinces. They are listed below, with their capitals and the territory of the former provinces that they mostly incorporated:

 
After only three years, following a coup d'état, the borders of the former provinces were restored, though not their autonomous status. They were now also called "departments" and Drenthe was added to Overijssel. In 1806 the Kingdom of Holland replaced the republic to further French interests. East Frisia, then as now in Germany, was added to the kingdom as a department in 1807 and Drenthe split off again making a total of 11 departments.

When the Netherlands finally did become fully part of France in 1810, the departments of the kingdom and their borders were largely maintained, with some joined. They were however nearly all renamed, again mainly after rivers, though the names differed from their Batavian counterparts. Following are their names and the modern day province they mostly correspond to:

 
With the defeat and withdrawal of the French in 1813, the old provinces and their names were re-established, Holland was reunited and East-Frisia went its separate way. The 17 provinces of the United Kingdom of the Netherlands were for a significant part based on the former French departments and their borders, in particular in what would later become Belgium.

There is continuous discussion within the Netherlands about the future of the provinces. Before 2014, the national government was planning to merge the provinces Flevoland, North Holland and Utrecht into a single province . Due to significant protest the plan was abandoned.

See also
ISO 3166-2:NL
Table of administrative divisions by country
Flags of provinces of the Netherlands
Coats of arms of provinces of the Netherlands
List of provinces of the Netherlands by Human Development Index

References

External links
Basic data for each province, with links to official province sites

Historical boundaries of provinces of the Netherlands 

 
Subdivisions of the Netherlands
Netherlands, Provinces
Netherlands 1
Provinces, Netherlands
Local government in the Netherlands